The Skopje Statistical Region (Albanian: Rajoni i Shkupit) is one of eight Statistical regions of North Macedonia. Skopje, located in the north of the country, borders Kosovo to the north. Internally, it borders the Vardar, Polog, Northeastern, Eastern, and Southwestern statistical regions.

Municipalities

The region consists of the City of Skopje and the following municipalities:
Aračinovo
Čučer-Sandevo
Ilinden
Petrovec
Sopište
Studeničani
Zelenikovo

Demographics

Population
The current population of the Skopje Statistical Region is 578,144 citizens, according to the last population census in 2002, accounting for 28.6% of the total national population. The region is the largest by population in North Macedonia.

Ethnicities

References

 
Statistical regions of North Macedonia
Geography of Skopje